Lucy Kay Hamilton (born 8 May 2006) is an Australian cricketer who plays as a left-arm medium bowler for Queensland in the Women's National Cricket League (WNCL) and Brisbane Heat in the Women's Big Bash League (WBBL).

Domestic career
Hamilton plays grade cricket for Sunshine Coast Cricket Club. She made her debut for Queensland on 15 March 2022, becoming the second youngest debutant ever for the side, aged 15. She took two wickets on debut, against Western Australia in the WNCL. She played one more match in the competition, without taking a wicket. In 2022–23, Hamilton played two matches for Brisbane Heat in the WBBL.

International career
In December 2022, Hamilton was selected in the Australia Under-19 squad for the 2023 ICC Under-19 Women's T20 World Cup. She took five wickets at an average of 10.80 at the tournament, including taking 2/0 from one over against Sri Lanka.

References

External links

Lucy Hamilton at Cricket Australia

2006 births
Living people
Sportspeople from Bundaberg
Australian women cricketers
Queensland Fire cricketers
Brisbane Heat (WBBL) cricketers